Circus Money is the second and final solo album by Walter Becker released on June 10, 2008 through the 5 Over 12 label (an imprint of Mailboat Records) both in CD and digital download formats and July 14, 2008 through Sonic360 for the rest of the world outside North America. The release is notable for not having the participation of fellow Steely Dan founder and bandmate, Donald Fagen.

The traditional mask featured on the album's cover is based on traditional Central Alaskan Yup'ik facewear.

Track listing 
All songs written by Walter Becker and Larry Klein, except "Circus Money", written by Becker.
 Door Number Two
 Downtown Canon
 Bob Is Not Your Uncle Anymore
 Upside Looking Down
 Paging Audrey
 Circus Money
 Selfish Gene
 Do You Remember The Name
 Somebody's Saturday Night
 Darkling Down
 God's Eye View
 Three Picture Deal
 Dark Horse Dub*

*International release only

Personnel
Musicians
 Walter Becker – vocal (1–12), guitar (1–2, 7, 9–10), bass (1–5, 7–12)
 Keith Carlock – drums (1–12), percussion (1)
 Jon Herington – guitar (1–12)
 Dean Parks – guitar (2, 4, 9)
 Ted Baker – keyboards (1–7, 9–12)
 Jim Beard – keyboards (1, 3, 5–8, 11–12)
 Henry Hey – keyboards (4, 8)
 Larry Goldings – organ (2, 10)
 Luciana Souza – pandeiro (9), background vocals (7)
 Gordon Gottlieb – percussion (2, 3, 7, 10–12)
 Chris Potter – tenor sax (1, 5–6)
 Roger Rosenberg – horns (11–12)
 Larry Klein – bass (6)
 Carolyn Leonhart-Escoffery – background vocals (1–5, 8–11)
 Kate Marokowitz – background vocals (1–2, 4, 6–7, 9–12)
 Cindy Mizelle – background vocals (1–2, 4–5, 9–12)
 Windy Wagner – background vocals (1–2, 4, 6, 9–12)
 Carmen Carter – background vocals (2, 6, 9)
 Tawatha Agee – background vocals (5, 12)
 Sharon Bryant – background vocals (5, 12)
 Sweet Pea Atkinson – background vocals (11)
 Sir Harry Bowens – background vocals (11)
 Terry Dexter – background vocals (11)
 Franki Richard – background vocals (11)
 Tiffany Wilson – background vocals (11)

Production
 Larry Klein – Producer
 Helik Hadar – Engineer
 Jay Messina – Engineer
 Elliot Scheiner – Engineer
 Bernie Grundman – Mastering engineer

References 

2008 albums
Albums produced by Larry Klein
Walter Becker albums